Sheykh Mazari (also Romanized as Sheykh Mazārī; also known as Sheykhlar-e Mazārī) is a village in Baranduz Rural District, in the Central District of Urmia County, West Azerbaijan Province, Iran. At the 2006 census, its population was 336, in 65 families.

References 

Populated places in Urmia County